Milorad Mandić Manda (3 May 1961 – 15 June 2016) was a Serbian actor. He appeared in more than sixty films during his career.

Biography 
At the age of 21, he became a member of the Belgrade Amateur Experimental Drama Studio. 6 years later, he graduated in acting from  Faculty of Dramatic Arts in the class of Professor Vladimir Jevtović. After graduating, he became a member of the Belgrade Children's Theater "Boško Buha". In 1989 he recorded more than 270 episodes of the show "Fairy Tale for Good Night", good night stories that were broadcast on national television. From 1989. to 1995 he hosted a children's show "On the Other Side of the Rainbow", which, together with  Branko Kockica, made him the most popular children's actor and entertainer. Since 1995 he hosted the show More Than a Game on  Pink.

Death 
Mandić suddenly died of a heart attack onstage during a matinee performance of Peter Pan on 15 June 2016. He was playing Captain Hook. The show was cancelled.

Selected filmography

References

External links 

1961 births
2016 deaths
Serbian male film actors
Male actors from Belgrade
Deaths onstage